The Sonata 8 is a sailboat that was designed by American Gary Mull as a one design racer and first built in 1979.

Production
The boat was built by Investigator Yachts in Australia starting in 1979, but the design is out of production.

The Sonata 8 design was developed into the Sonata 26 in 1980 and produced by the same manufacturer. The two boats share the same specifications.

Design
The Sonata 8 is a small recreational keelboat, built predominantly of fiberglass, with wood trim. It has a fractional sloop rig, a transom-hung rudder and a lifting or optionally fixed fin keel. It displaces  and carries  of ballast.

Operational history
After its introduction in 1979 the design was raced in Australia as a one-design class.

See also
List of sailing boat types

Related development
Sonata 26

Similar sailboats
Tanzer 26

References

Keelboats
1970s sailboat type designs
Sailing yachts
Trailer sailers
Sailboat type designs by Gary Mull
Sailboat types built by Investigator Yachts